The Mayor of Kozhikode (Formerly Mayor of Calicut) is the first citizen of the Indian city of Kozhikode (formerly Calicut). This person is the chief of the Kozhikode Municipal Corporation.

Mayor 
The 26th mayor is Thottathil Raveendran, elected in 2016.the 27th Mayor is Dr. Beena Philip, elected in 2020 december 28.

Former mayors 
Manjunatha rao is the first mayor of calicut

M. Bhaskaran
A.K. Premajam
U.T. Rajan
M.M. Padmavathy
V.K.C Mohammed  Koya
 Thottathil Ravindran
T.P. Dasan
Dr. Beena Philip

References

Mayors of Kozhikode
Kerala municipal councillors
Politicians from Kozhikode